Sir Alexander St John (died June 1657)  was an English politician who sat in the House of Commons variously between 1621 and 1629.

St John was a son of Oliver St John, 3rd Baron St John of Bletso and his wife Dorothy Reid, daughter  of Sir John Rede or Reid, of Odington, Gloucestershire. He was admitted fellow commoner at Queens' College, Cambridge on 9 November 1601. He was knighted on 5 August 1608 at Bletsoe together with his brother Anthony.  Apart from Anthony, four other brothers, Oliver, Rowland, Beauchamp and Henry were to become MPs. 

In 1614 St John was elected Member of Parliament for Bedford and was re-elected in 1621 and 1624. In 1626 and 1628 he was elected MP for Barnstaple. He sat until 1629 when King Charles decided to rule without parliament for eleven years. 

St John married Margaret Draynor, the widow of Thomas Draynor and daughter of John Trye, of Hardwick, Gloucestershire. He survived her death in 1656 and caused a white marble monument, adorned with pilasters, entablature, pediment, and two Cupids, to be erected in her memory in the church of St Leonards, Shoreditch. He left no children.

His eldest brother Oliver inherited the Barony and became Earl of Bolingbroke.

References

  

Year of birth missing
People from the Borough of Bedford
Place of birth missing
Alexander
Alumni of Queens' College, Cambridge
English MPs 1614
English MPs 1621–1622
English MPs 1626
English MPs 1628–1629
1657 deaths
Younger sons of barons
Members of the Parliament of England (pre-1707) for Barnstaple